Justice Chapman may refer to:

Asa Chapman, associate justice of the Connecticut Supreme Court
Frederick Chapman (judge) (1849–1936), New Zealand Supreme Court Judge
Roy H. Chapman, associate justice of the Florida Supreme Court